Cabanillas de la Sierra is a municipality of the autonomous community of Madrid, Spain. It has an area of 14.07 km2.

References

External links

Municipalities in the Community of Madrid